Kindevas are a race of human-like beings mentioned in the Hindu Puranas. They are said to have a human-like appearance, but also deva-like qualities, hence the term kindeva.

Kindevas look human but they require no sleep, no food, they have no body odor, no sweat, no fatigue. Upon seeing one of these beings one may ask "is it a deva?", but they are actually a race of human beings existing on another world or loka.

See also
 Guhyaka 
 Siddha
 Gandharva
 Vidyadhara
 Caranas
 Kinnara
 Nagas
 Kimpurusa
 Apsara

Characters in Hindu mythology
Puranas